Wrestle Peter Pan 2019 was a Japanese professional wrestling event promoted by DDT Pro-Wrestling (DDT). The event took place on July 15, 2019, in Tokyo at the Ota City General Gymnasium. The event featured thirteen matches, five of which were contested for championships. The event aired on Fighting TV Samurai and on DDT's video on demand service DDT Universe. This was the first Peter Pan event to have its name written in rōmaji.

Storylines
The Wrestle Peter Pan 2019 event featured thirteen professional wrestling matches that involved different wrestlers from pre-existing scripted feuds and storylines. Wrestlers portrayed villains, heroes, or less distinguishable characters in the scripted events that built tension and culminated in a wrestling match or series of matches.

By winning the King of DDT tournament on May 19, Konosuke Takeshita earned a title match in the main event against KO-D Openweight Champion Tetsuya Endo.

Event
First on the undercard was an exhibition match presented by Hotel Cent Inn Kurashiki between trainee Keigo Nakamura and Kota Umeda.

Next was a six-woman tag team match presented by JPA, an accounting management company, featuring Tokyo Joshi Pro Wrestling talents.

On the main card, Saki Akai faced Yoshiko from SEAdLINNNG.

Next, Akito defended the DDT Extreme Championship against Asuka in an Ippon Fluorescent Light Tube Deathmatch in which a single light tube was used. Per the rules, whoever would break the tube would be declared the loser of the match.

Before the next match, a backstage segment was shown in which Toru Owashi, the then Ironman Heavymetalweight Champion, broke up an argument between Gorgeous Matsuno and masked wrestler Furitsuke Kamen. Matsuno and Furitsuke began fighting until Furitsuke was unmasked, revealing that he was actually Lucky Ikeda, a well-known tarento. In the confusion, Ikeda pinned Owashi to become the 1,375th champion.

During the Rumble rules match, the title went from Ikeda to Matsuno to Tomomitsu Matsunaga to Mad Paulie and then to Kazuki Hirata before Hirata was eventually eliminated by Yukio Sakaguchi. Michiaki Nakano from Souken Holdings, a sponsor of the match, presented Sakaguchi with the match prize then tried to pin him but Sakaguchi stopped him.

Next was a match dubbed "2nd Generation Human Windmill vs. 3rd Generation Taihō" between Hideki Suzuki (whose nickname is "The 2nd Generation Human Windmill") and Yukio Naya (the grandson of Taihō Kōki, the 48th yokozuna in the sport of sumo wrestling).

Sanshiro Takagi faced Super Sasadango Machine in a Weapon Rumble match in which various weapons secretly chosen by the participants beforehand were being introduced one after another at regular intervals. This was a title match for the inaugural O-40 Championship, a title reserved for wrestlers over 40 years old.

Next, mixed martial artist Shinya Aoki faced Danshoku Dino in a match with special rules. The match was limited to ten rounds lasting three minutes each, every odd numbered round would be fought under strict fighting rules with no pins allowed and every even numbered round would be fought under regular professional wrestling rules with "courtship" allowed. Mina Shirakawa was the ring girl for the odd numbered rounds and Yuki Iino was the "ring boy" for the even numbered rounds.

Next, Damnation (Daisuke Sasaki and Soma Takao) defended the KO-D Tag Team Championship against the team of Harashima and Yasu Urano in a match sponsored by Souken Holdings.

In the main event, Konosuke Takeshita challenged Tetsuya Endo for the KO-D Openweight Championship. Takeshita won the bout and was granted a 2,000,000 yen prize and one year of Blackout products by Casting Dot JP Co., Ltd., the sponsor of the match.

Results

Rumble rules match

Footnotes

References

External links
The official DDT Pro-Wrestling website
Wrestle Peter Pan 2019 at ProWrestlingHistory.com

DDT Peter Pan
2019 in professional wrestling
July 2019 events in Japan
Professional wrestling in Tokyo
2019 in Tokyo
Events in Tokyo